Do Dooni Panj is a 2019 Indian-Punjabi drama film directed by Harry Bhatti. The film stars Amrit Maan, Isha Rikhi, Rana Ranbir, Karamjit Anmol, Sardar Sohi, Harby Sangha, and Nirmal Rishi in prominent roles. The film is produced by Badshah (rapper) & Uchana Amit under his production house Apra Films.

Cast 

 Amrit Maan
 Isha Rikhi as Noor
 Rana Ranbir as Magistrate
 Karamjit Anmol as Kala Halwaai
 Sardar Sohi as Principal
 Harby Sangha
 Nirmal Rishi
 Harby Sangha
 Nisha Bano
 Rupinder Rupi as Anju Devi
 Malkeet Rauni as Gurdeep Singh
 Tarsem Paul as Teacher Inerjeet
 Preeto Sawhney as A Teacher

Soundtrack 

Soundtrack of the film is composed by Badshah, The Boss and Jassi Katyal. Also, features the vocals from Rahat Fateh Ali Khan, Neha Kakkar, Badshah, Amrit Maan, Jordan Sandhu, and The Landers. The songs "Jacketan Lightan Waliyan" and "Peg" by Amrit Maan, "Fikar" by Khan and Kakkar were well received by audience. Full soundtrack was released on 4 January 2019 on iTunes and other music platforms by Sony Music India.

References

External links 

 

2019 films
Punjabi-language Indian films
2010s Punjabi-language films
Indian romantic comedy films
2019 romantic comedy films
Films scored by Badshah
Films scored by Jassi Katyal